Comercocha (possibly from Quechua q'umir green, qucha lake, "green lake") is a  mountain in the Vilcanota mountain range in the Andes of Peru. It is located in the Cusco Region, Canchis Province, Checacupe District. Comercocha lies southwest of the glaciated area of Quelccaya (Quechua for "snow plain"): It is situated south of the Huancane River near a lake named Soracocha.

References

Mountains of Peru
Mountains of Cusco Region